The Old Catholic Church of Austria is the Austrian member church of the Union of Utrecht of the Old Catholic Churches. 

In 1997, the church began ordaining women. In 2007, the church elected as its head Bishop John Okoro, a Nigerian former Roman Catholic priest, who became a member of the Old Catholic Church of Austria in 1999. Prior to his election he had been the parish priest in Vorarlberg. He retired in 2015, and new Bishop Heinz Lederleitner was elected at the Synod meeting in Klagenfurt on 24 October 2015, and consecrated in Vienna on 13 February 2016.

Within the Union of Utrecht, the Old Catholic Church of Austria also has delegated jurisdiction over the Old Catholic Church of Croatia, and other regions of former Yugoslavia.

Old Catholic Bishops of Austria

The following bishops have governed the Old Catholic Church in Austria.
	
 Adalbert Schindelaar (1925-1926)
 Robert Tüchler (1928-1942)
 Stefan Török (1948-1972)
 Nikolaus Hummel (1975-1994)
 Bernhard Heitz (1994-2007)
 John Okoro (2008-2015)
 Heinz Lederleitner (2016-)

References

External links
 

Catholicism in Austria
Union of Utrecht of the Old Catholic Churches
Religious organizations established in 1877
Christian denominations established in the 19th century
1877 establishments in Austria-Hungary